Crump's Mill and Millpond is a historic grist mill and mill pond located near Talleysville, New Kent County, Virginia. The mill is dated to the 1870s, and is a simple rectangular two-story frame structure with a gable roof. Much of the mill machinery survives at Crump's Mill. It replaced a mill built before 1818 and destroyed by fire in 1872, and remained in operation until 1955.  The damming of South Branch in the early-19th century created a large millpond in the shape of the letter "L."  The mill sits behind the dam
that creates the 16-acre millpond. The mill and millpond are both located on private property.

It was listed on the National Register of Historic Places in 1999.

References

Grinding mills on the National Register of Historic Places in Virginia
Buildings and structures in New Kent County, Virginia
National Register of Historic Places in New Kent County, Virginia
Grinding mills in Virginia